Valerio Ruggeri (February 12, 1934 – July 4, 2015) was an Italian actor and voice actor.

Biography
Born in Cinisello Balsamo, which is located in the city centre of Milan, Ruggeri began his career on stage with Dario Fo and Franca Rame in the early 1960s and worked as a voice actor since the late 1950s. He was best known for dubbing characters mainly in anime and animation, being primarily known for being the Italian voice of Rabbit in the Winnie the Pooh franchise and the second voice of Herbert from Family Guy, replacing Mario Milita who retired in 2012.

In Ruggeri's live action dubbed roles, he voiced Grandpa Joe (portrayed by David Kelly) in the Italian version of the 2005 film Charlie and the Chocolate Factory as well as Nels Oleson (portrayed by Richard Bull) in the Italian version of Little House on the Prairie. He also made cameo appearances in the Italian cinema, appearing in such films as A Quiet Place in the Country and The Leopard.

Death
Ruggeri died of a heart attack on July 4, 2015, at the age of 81. The voices of Herbert and Rabbit were passed on to Angelo Nicotra and Mino Caprio respectively.

Filmography

Cinema
The Leopard (1963)
A Quiet Place in the Country (1968)
Dirty Weekend (1973)
The Assassination of Matteotti (1973)
A Genius, Two Partners and a Dupe (1975)
Fantozzi (1975)
Last Touch of Love (1978)

Dubbing roles

Animation
Rabbit in The Many Adventures of Winnie the Pooh
Rabbit in Pooh's Grand Adventure: The Search for Christopher Robin
Rabbit in The Tigger Movie
Rabbit in Piglet's Big Movie
Rabbit in Pooh's Heffalump Movie
Rabbit in Winnie the Pooh
Rabbit in The New Adventures of Winnie the Pooh
Rabbit in The Book of Pooh
Rabbit in My Friends Tigger & Pooh
Herbert in Family Guy (episodes 4x25-26 and seasons 10–12)
Herbert in The Cleveland Show
Francis Griffin in Family Guy (episode 5x10)
Secretary in Lucky and Zorba
Elder Gutknecht in Corpse Bride
Sam McKeane in Atlantis: Milo's Return
Abner in Home on the Range
Grimsby in The Little Mermaid II: Return to the Sea
Waldorf in The Muppets
Waldorf in Muppets Most Wanted
Rudy in Kronk's New Groove
Bishop in Shrek

Live action
Grandpa Joe in Charlie and the Chocolate Factory
Chief Steward in Herbie Goes Bananas
Father Time in The Santa Clause 3: The Escape Clause
Bogrod in Harry Potter and the Deathly Hallows – Part 2
Nels Oleson in Little House on the Prairie
Taxi Driver in Delicatessen

Video games
Merlin Munroe in Bugs Bunny: Lost in Time

References

External links

1934 births
2015 deaths
People from Cinisello Balsamo
Italian male voice actors
Italian male film actors
Italian male stage actors
Italian male video game actors
20th-century Italian male actors
21st-century Italian male actors